The Granada Theatre was a 3,400–seat movie palace located at 6427-41 North Sheridan Road in the Rogers Park neighborhood of Chicago.  It was constructed in 1926 for the Marks Brothers, who were major theatre operators in the U.S. Edward E. Eichenbaum was the principal designer for the architectural firm of Levy & Klein. Eichenbaum also designed the Marbro, Regal, and Century theatres. 

The Marks Brothers operated the theatre until 1934, when Balaban and Katz purchased the property. That firm and its successors—United Paramount Theatres, ABC Great States Theatres and Plitt Theatres—operated the facility until approximately 1978. From then until the mid-eighties, it was used sporadically for rock concerts and presented midnight showings of The Rocky Horror Picture Show for several years.

Despite all attempts to save the theatre, Senior Life Styles Corporation purchased the property and demolished it in 1989-90 for a planned apartment/commercial structure.

The new 16–story apartment tower and shopping arcade constructed in 1991 was named "Granada Center". Loyola University eventually purchased the structure and transformed it into 12 floors of student apartments over a base containing parking, retail and university offices.

The Ryerson & Burnham Libraries at the Art Institute of Chicago holds archival materials, including photographs taken by the "Save Granada Theatre Committee".

References

Further reading

External links
 Balaban and Katz Official Site
 CinemaTour
 Cinema Treasures

Cinemas and movie theaters in Chicago
Demolished theatres in Illinois
Demolished buildings and structures in Chicago
Former cinemas in the United States
Buildings and structures demolished in 1989